Cop Secret is a 2021 Icelandic action comedy film directed by Hannes Þór Halldórsson from a screenplay that he co-wrote alongside Nína Pedersen and Sverrir Þór Sverrisson. The film stars Auðunn Blöndal, Egill Einarsson, Björn Hlynur Haraldsson and Steinunn Ólína Þorsteinsdóttir.

The film is based on a fake movie trailer made by Auðunn, Hannes and Sverrir Þór Sverrisson for a TV show in 2011. The trailer featured Gísli Örn Garðarsson, Hjalti Árnason, Ingvar Eggert Sigurðsson, Hörður Magnússon and Hermann Gunnarsson. It premièred in the Concorso internazionale at the 74th Locarno Film Festival on 10 August 2021.

Synopsis
A cop (Auðunn Blöndal) in denial of his sexuality, falls in love with his new partner (Egill Einarsson), while investigating a string of bank robberies where nothing seems to have been stolen.

Cast
 Auðunn Blöndal as Bússi
 Egill Einarsson as Hörður
 Steinunn Ólína Þorsteinsdóttir as Þorgerður
 Vivian Ólafsdóttir as Stefanía
 Sverrir Þór Sverrisson as Klemenz
 Björn Hlynur Haraldsson as Rikki
 Júlíana Sara Gunnarsdóttir as Lilja
 Gunnar Hansson as Softý
 Jón Gnarr as Jón Gnarr
 Rúrik Gíslason
 Bríet
 Jón Jónsson
 Guðmundur Benediktsson as himself

Production
On 19 January 2021 it was announced that the Hannes Þór Halldórsson directional debut film Cop Secret will be presented on the Nordic Film Market on 5 February 2021.

Principal photography concluded in Iceland on December 2020.

Release
The film premièred in the Concorso internazionale at the 74th Locarno Film Festival on 21 August 2021. It was first theatrically released in Island on 22 October 2021, while its release on VOD was in the U.K. and Ireland on 23 May 2022 by Vertigo Releasing, and in North America on 12 July 2022. It was screened at the Brussels International Fantastic Film Festival on 6 September 2022.

Reception

Box office
Cop Secret grossed 76 million ISK (about $588,651) only in Iceland in 2021, coming in second in the box office behind No Time to Die.

Critical response
On review aggregator Rotten Tomatoes, the film holds an approval rating of 84% based on 19 reviews, with an average rating of 6.5/10.

Jay Weissberg of Variety said of the film: "Entertaining? Yes, by and large. Clever? Not by a long shot." Gunnar Ragnarsson of RÚV criticized the film, stating that he film's action and endless pop culture references get tired after a while and that lead actor Auðunn Blöndal did not yet have the ability to carry a film. In her review for Eye for Film, Jane Fae remembers that the film explicitly mentions Die Hard 3.

References

External links
 
 

2021 films
2020s Icelandic-language films
2021 directorial debut films
2021 LGBT-related films
Icelandic LGBT-related films
2021 action comedy films
Icelandic action comedy films